Khokhlovka is a rural locality (a selo) in Khokhlovskoye Rural Settlement, Permsky District, Perm Krai, Russia. The population was 12 as of 2010. There are 4 streets.

Geography 
Khokhlovka is located 46 km north of Perm (the district's administrative centre) by road. Verkhnyaya Khokhlovka is the nearest rural locality.

References 

Rural localities in Permsky District